"Everything" is a song by Dum Dums, released as their debut single in 2000. It was also included on their album It Goes Without Saying.

Track listing

CD1
"Everything" - 2:47
"You Knock Me Off My Feet" - 3:14
"Losing Your Mind" - 3:18

CD2
"Everything" - 2:47
"Mr. Executive" - 3:11
"Lucy's About To Beach" - 2:20
"Everything (Video)"

Chart performance
"Everything" entered the UK Singles Chart the week of 28-02-2000 at #21.

References 

Dum Dums (band) songs
2000 singles
2000 songs